Teitelboim is a surname that may refer to:
 Volodia Teitelboim (1916–2008), Chilean communist politician, lawyer, and author
 Claudio Bunster (born 1947) (formerly Claudio Teitelboim), Chilean theoretical physicist
 Dora Teitelboim (1914–1992)